The 2016 North African Tri Nations was the firsth annual North African Tri Nations rugby union tournament held between the national rugby union teams of Algeria, Morocco and Tunisia. The 2016 tournament was held in Oran between 17 and 24 December 2016. Morocco wins this first edition

Venue

Fixtures

Standings

References

External links
Le premier Tri Nations du Maghreb - World Rugby official website

2016
International rugby union competitions hosted by Algeria
2016 in African rugby union
2016 rugby union tournaments for national teams